Malaxis discolor  is a species of orchid that is endemic to Sri Lanka.

It generally has purple leaves and yellow flowers.

References

discolor
Orchids of Sri Lanka
Endemic flora of Sri Lanka
Plants described in 1830